Tabylgyty is a village in Naryn Region, Kyrgyzstan. It is part of the Jumgal District. Its population was 517 in 2021.

References
 

Populated places in Naryn Region